Netzschkau is a town in the Vogtlandkreis district, in the Free State of Saxony, Germany. It is situated 6 km southeast of Greiz, and 21 km southwest of Zwickau.

Demographics

Historical population 
Development of population (from 1960 as of 31 December):

  Data source since 1998: Statistisches Landesamt Sachsen

References 

Towns in Saxony
Vogtlandkreis